Melid, also known as Arslantepe, was an ancient city on the Tohma River, a tributary of the upper Euphrates rising in the Taurus Mountains. It has been identified with the modern archaeological site of Arslantepe near Malatya, Turkey.

It was named a UNESCO World Heritage Site under the name Arslantepe Mound on 26 July 2021.

History

Late Chalcolithic
The earliest habitation at the site dates back to the Chalcolithic period.

Arslantepe (VII) became important in this region in the Late Chalcolithic. A monumental area with a huge mudbrick building stood on top of a mound. This large building had wall decorations; its function is uncertain.

Degirmentepe
Değirmentepe, a site located 24 km northeast of Melid, is notable as the location of the earliest secure evidence of copper smelting. The site was built on a small natural outcrop in the flood plain about 40m from the Euphrates River.

Early Bronze
By the late Uruk period development had grown to include a large temple/palace complex.

Culturally, Melid was part of the "Northern regions of Greater Mesopotamia" functioning as a trade colony along the Euphrates River bringing raw materials to Sumer (Lower Mesopotamia).

Numerous similarities have been found between these early layers at Arslantepe, and the somewhat later site of Birecik (Birecik Dam Cemetery), also in Turkey, to the southwest of Melid.

Around 3000 BCE, the transitional EBI-EBII, there was widespread burning and destruction, after which Kura-Araxes culture pottery appeared in the area. This was a mainly pastoralist culture connected with the Caucasus mountains.

Late Bronze Age
In the Late Bronze Age, the site became an administrative center of a larger region in the kingdom of Isuwa. The city was heavily fortified, probably due to the Hittite threat from the west. It was culturally influenced by the Hurrians, Mitanni and the Hittites.

Around 1350 BC, Suppiluliuma I of the Hittites conquered Melid in his war against Tushratta of Mitanni. At the time Melid was a regional capital of Isuwa at the frontier between the Hittites and the Mitanni; it was loyal to Tushratta. Suppiluliuma I used Melid as a base for his military campaign to sack the Mitanni capital Wassukanni.

Iron Age
After the end of the Hittite empire, from the 12th to 7th century BC, the city became the center of an independent Luwian Neo-Hittite state of Kammanu, also known as 'Malizi'. A palace was built and monumental stone sculptures of lions and the ruler erected.

In the 12th century, Melid was probably dependent on Karkemiš, where king Kuzi-Tešub ruled. His two grandsons, Runtyas (Runtiya) and Arnuwantis, were at first appointed as “Country Lords” of Melid, but later they also became kings of Melid.

The encounter with the Assyrian king Tiglath-Pileser I (1115–1077 BC) resulted in the kingdom of Melid being forced to pay tribute to Assyria. Melid remained able to prosper until the Assyrian king Sargon II (722–705 BC) sacked the city in 712 BC. At the same time, the Cimmerians and Scythians invaded Anatolia and the city declined.

According to Igor Diakonoff and John Greppin, there was likely an Armenian presence in Melid by 1200 BCE.

Archaeology
Arslantepe was first investigated by the French archaeologist Louis Delaporte from 1932 to 1939. From 1946 to 1951 Claude F.A. Schaeffer carried out some soundings.

The first Italian excavations at the site of Arslantepe started in 1961, and were conducted under the direction of Professors Piero Meriggi and Salvatore M. Puglisi until 1968. The choice of the site was initially due to their desire to investigate the Neo-Hittite phases of occupation at the site, a period in which Malatya was the capital of one of the most important reigns born after the destruction of the Hittite Empire in its most eastern borders. Majestic remains of this period had been known from Arslantepe since the 1930s after they were brought to light by a French expedition. The Hittitologist Meriggi only took part in the first few campaigns and later left the direction to Puglisi, a palaeoethnologist, who expanded and regularly conducted yearly investigations under regular permit from the Turkish government. Alba Palmieri took over the supervision of the excavation during the 1970s. In the early 21st century, the archaeological investigation was led by Marcella Frangipane.

Early swords
The first swords known in the Early Bronze Age (c. 33rd to 31st centuries) are based on finds at Arslantepe by Marcella Frangipane of Rome University. A cache of nine swords and daggers was found; they are composed of arsenic-copper alloy. Among them, three swords were beautifully inlaid with silver.

These weapons have a total length of 45 to 60 cm which suggests their description as either short swords or long daggers.

These discoveries were made back in the 1980s. They belong to the local phase VI A. Also, 12 spearheads were found.

Phase VI A at Arslantepe ended in destruction—the city was burned. Later on, some new occupants also left some bronze weapons, including swords. They were found in the rich tomb of "Signori Arslantepe" or "Signor Arslantepe", as he was called by archaeologists. He was about 40 years old, and the tomb is radiocarbon dated to 3081–2897 BCE.

See also

 List of Neo-Hittite kings
Cities of the Ancient Near East
Short chronology timeline

Notes

References

Bibliography

Louis De Laporte, La porte des lions, 1940
Vignola, Cristiano, et al., "Changes in the Near Eastern chronology between the 5th and the 3rd millennium BC: New AMS 14C dates from Arslantepe (Turkey)", Nuclear Instruments and Methods in Physics Research Section B: Beam Interactions with Materials and Atoms 456, pp. 276-282, 2019

External links
Missione Archeologica Italiana in Anatolia Orientale Arslantepe site

Buildings and structures in Malatya Province
Hittite sites in Turkey
Kammanu
Former populated places in Turkey
Cylinder and impression seals in archaeology
Archaeological sites in Eastern Anatolia
Kura-Araxes culture
World Heritage Sites in Turkey
Uruk period
Archaeological sites in Turkey
Buildings damaged by the 2023 Turkey–Syria earthquake